Gabriele Evertz (born 1945 in Berlin) is an American painter, curator and professor who is applying the history and theory of color in her work. She is known for abstract color painting and Geometric abstraction.

Life and work
Gabriele Evertz emigrated to the United States at the age of 19. She holds an M.F.A. in painting and a B.A. in art history, both from Hunter College, where she is teaching since 1998. She is a member of the American Abstract Artists. Gabriele Evertz lives and works in New York. 2012 she received the Basil H. Alkazzi Award for Excellence in Painting.

Evertz is considered a longtime member of the Hunter Color School, along with Doug Ohlson, Robert Swain, Vincent Longo, Joanna Pousette-Dart, and Sanford Wurmfeld. Although all artists have found their own individual means of expression, they are united in their exploration of the phenomenology of color in order to initiate a transformative effect on the viewer.

Work 

Evertz's paintings consist of vertical lines, for which she uses all colors of the color circle. In her latest compositions she turns to the color grey and its effects on surrounding colors. Occasionally, she also uses metallic colors, as these can reflect the light and set additional color impulses. She often repeats certain color constellations within an artwork.

While viewing the painting, the mind's eye constantly swings between perceiving the entire picture and the concentration on individual aspects of the work. The viewer thus perceives a kind of vibration of the color: The resulting paintings present a barrage of visual information that moves color and form in and out of sequence and symmetry causing the eye to move through undulating, pulsating spaces. This becomes particularly evident when the viewer takes different distances from the picture. The resulting parallax intensifies the experience of the vibration and oscillation of the color.

It is solely through the viewers' perception of the composition, through their movement in the room and the resulting different perception of closeness and distance, that oscillation and vibration arise, which turns the viewing of the works into an individual and possibly even spiritual experience: People think geometry is very static, but it isn't. It's moving all the time. I'm keeping the same color sequence but changing the background. so as you engage in it, it changes. The colors are the actors. These are really vessels of contemplation.

 Videography (selection) 
 2010: Michael Feldmann: Gabriele Evertz Paints a Color Study, 09′ 05″ 
 2010: Michael Feldmann: Gabriele Evertz Documentary, 03′ 21″ 
 2016: Macbamuseo: Geometric Obsession. American School 1965–2015  01′ 54″

 Works in collections (selection) 
 Columbus Museum of Art, Ohio
 Museum of Fine Arts, Boston, Massachusetts
 Brooklyn Museum, New York
 Harvard University Museum, Cambridge, Massachusetts
 Hallmark Collection, Kansas City, Missouri
 Metropolitan Museum of Art, New York
 Museum of Modern Art, New York
 The New York Public Library, New York
 New Jersey State Museum, Trenton, New Jersey
 The Phillips Collection, Washington, D.C.
 The Princeton University Library, Princeton, New Jersey
 St. Lawrence University Art Museum, Canton, New York
 Whitney Museum of American Art, New York
 The British Museum, London, England
 Osthaus Museum Hagen, Hagen, Germany
 MACBA Museum of Contemporary Art in Buenos Aires, Argentina
 Wilhelm Hack Museum, Ludwigshafen, Germany

 Solo exhibitions (selection) 
 2006: LIV, Benton Nyce Gallery, Greenport, New York
 2011: Gabriele Evertz – Rapture, Minus Space, New York 
 2012: Gabriele Evertz – Optic Drive, David Richard Gallery, Santa Fe, New Mexico
 2012: Gabriele Evertz – The Geometry of Color, Art Sites Gallery, Riverhead, New York
 2015: The Gray Question, Minus Space, New York
 2017: Gabriele Evertz – Color Relativity, 499 Park Ave Lobby Gallery, New York
 2018: Flagge zeigen – Gabriele Evertz, Radevormwald, Germany
 2020: Gabriele Evertz – Exaltation, Minus Space, New York
 2022: Gabriele Evertz – Path, Minus Space, New York

 Group exhibitions (selection) 
 2010: Escape from New York, Massey University, Wellington, New Zealand
 2010: Escape from New York, Project Space Spare Room, RMIT University, Melbourne, Australia
 2011: Pointing a Telescope at the Sun, Minus Space, New York
 2011: American Abstract Artists International, Deutscher Künstlerbund, Berlin, Germany
 2012: Minus Space, The Suburban Gallery, Chicago, Illinois (with Mark Dagley und Gilbert Hsiao)
 2012: Buzz, Galeria Nara Roesler, Sao Paulo, Brazil
 2012: Seeing Red. A Group Exhibition, David Richard Gallery, Santa Fe, New Mexico
 2013: Hauptsache Grau, Mies van der Rohe Haus, Berlin, Germany
 2014: A Global Exchange: Geometric Abstraction Since 1950, The Patricia & Phillip Frost Art Museum, Miami, Florida
 2014: Doppler Shift, Visual Arts Center of New Jersey, Summit, New Jersey 
 2014: Intervention. Flagge zeigen, Banner Projekt, Radevormwald, Germany
 2014: Hard Edge Abstraction: Paintings and Works on Paper, St. Lawrence University, Canton, New York
 2015: Territory of Abstraction, Pentimenti Gallery, Philadelphia, Pennsylvania
 2015: Breaking Pattern, Minus Space, New York 
 2015: Geometric Obsession. American School 1965–2015, Museum de Arte Contemporaneo Buenos Aires, Buenos Aires, Argentina
 2015: Op Infinitum: 'The Responsive Eye' Fifty Years After, David Richard Gallery, Santa Fe, New Mexico
 2016: Painting Color, Glassell Gallery at the Louisiana State University, Baton Rouge, Louisiana
 2016: Color, Philip Slein Gallery, St. Louis, Missouri
 2017: Polychromy: Gabriele Evertz and Sanford Wurmfeld, Minus Space, New York
 2017: Extended Progress, Saturation Point Projects, London, England
 2018: Radiant Energy, Visual Art Center of New Jersey, Summit, New Jersey

 Curatorial work (selection) 
 2003: Seeing Red: Contemporary Nonobjective Painting, (curated together with Michael Fehr) Hunter College/Times Square Gallery, New York
 2006: Presentational Painting III, Hunter College/Times Square Gallery, New York
 2009: Color Exchange Berlin-New York, Galerie Parterre, Berlin, Germany (the exhibition travelled later to the gallery Metaphor Contemporary Art), New York
 2010: Visual Sensations, The Paintings of Robert Swain: 1967–2010, Hunter College/Times Square Gallery, New York
 2017: Dual Current: Inseparable Elements in Painting and Architecture'', University of Tennessee, Knoxville, (later the exhibition travelled to the Murray State University, Murray, Kentucky and to the University of Alabama, Tuscaloosa, Alabama)

Further reading

References

External links
 
 Gabriele Evertz at artfacts.net
 Geoform.net – Online scholarly resource for geometric art
 Collection of Gabriele Evertz's works
 Article by Larissa Kikol 2022 about the art art museum and the exhibition Stripe Artists

Living people
1945 births
21st-century American painters
Painters from New York City
American abstract artists
American women painters
Artists from Berlin
Hunter College faculty
21st-century American women artists